The 1973 All-Big Eight Conference football team consists of American football players chosen by various organizations for All-Big Eight Conference teams for the 1973 NCAA Division I football season.  The selectors for the 1973 season included the Associated Press (AP).

Offensive selections

Ends
 Emmett Edwards, Kansas (AP)
 Frosty Anderson, Nebraska (AP)

Offensive tackles
 Daryl White, Nebraska (AP)
 Jim Schnietz, Missouri (AP)

Offensive guards
 Bill Brittain, Kansas State (AP)
 Doug Payton, Colorado (AP)

Centers
 Scott Anderson, Missouri (AP)

Quarterbacks
 David Jaynes, Kansas (AP)

Backs
 Joe Washington, Oklahoma (AP)
 Isaac Jackson, Kansas State (AP)
 Mike Strachan, Iowa State (AP)

Defensive selections

Defensive ends
 Steve Manstedt, Nebraska (AP)
 Steve Zook, Kansas (AP)

Defensive tackles
 John Dutton, Nebraska (AP)
 Barry Price, Oklahoma State (AP)

Middle guards
 Lucious Selmon, Oklahoma (AP)

Linebackers
 Cleveland Vann, Oklahoma State (AP)
 Rod Shoate, Oklahoma (AP)
 Lawrence Hunt, Iowa State (AP)

Defensive backs
 Randy Hughes, Oklahoma (AP)
 John Moseley, Missouri (AP)
 Kurt Knoff, Kansas (AP)

Key

AP = Associated Press

See also
 1973 College Football All-America Team

References

All-Big Seven Conference football team
All-Big Eight Conference football teams